Spalding is a village in the Canadian province of Saskatchewan within the Rural Municipality of Spalding No. 368 and Census Division No. 14. It is named after Spalding, Lincolnshire, birthplace of the wife of the first postmaster for Spalding. The local economy is dominated by agriculture.

History 
Spalding incorporated as a village on March 11, 1924.

The town has two municipal heritage properties:
 The Reynold Rapp Residence is a municipal designated historic building. The property is a two-story wood house that was constructed in 1926.  In 1948, Reynold Rapp and his family moved into the house.  He served as town overseer from 1950 to 1957 and as a member of Parliament from 1958 until 1968.  The property was donated to the community in 1971 to serve as the home of the Reynold Rapp Museum, that was opened in 1972 by  John Diefenbaker.
Spalding United Church is a historic wood-frame church built in 1926. The design uses Gothic Revival and Tudor Revival elements.

Demographics 

Notable people 
 Spalding is the birthplace of actress Kari Matchett.
 Spalding is the birthplace of author Paul Yee.
 Spalding is the birthplace of classical/operatic bass-baritone singer Nathan Berg.

References 

Villages in Saskatchewan
Spalding No. 368, Saskatchewan
Division No. 14, Saskatchewan